Aleksey Khodnevich (born 2 November 1987) is a Belarusian footballer playing currently for Ostrovets.

In 2021 Khodnevich scored a record-setting 59 goals for Ostrovets in Belarusian Second League.

References

External links
 
 Profile at kick-off.by
 

1987 births
Living people
Belarusian footballers
Association football forwards
FC Dnepr Mogilev players
FC Rudziensk players
FC SKVICH Minsk players
FC Gorodeya players
FC Energetik-BGU Minsk players
FC Smolevichi players
FC Orsha players
FC Livadiya Dzerzhinsk players
FC Krumkachy Minsk players
FC Uzda players
FC Shakhtyor Petrikov players
FC Ostrovets players